James B. Baker House is a historic home located at Aberdeen, Harford County, Maryland.  It is a large three story frame residence constructed in 1896 in the Queen Anne style. It features multiple gables, projections, dormers, and balconies enlivening its essentially square form and high hipped roof. James B. Baker was a leading entrepreneur in the canning industry.

It was listed on the National Register of Historic Places in 1982.

References

External links
, including photo from 1980, Maryland Historical Trust

Houses on the National Register of Historic Places in Maryland
Houses in Harford County, Maryland
Houses completed in 1896
Queen Anne architecture in Maryland
Aberdeen, Maryland
National Register of Historic Places in Harford County, Maryland